The original Star Wars trilogy, formerly marketed as the Star Wars Trilogy (and colloquially referred to as the 'original trilogy'), is the first set of three films produced in the Star Wars franchise, an American space opera created by George Lucas. It was produced by Lucasfilm and distributed by 20th Century Fox, and consists of Star Wars (1977), The Empire Strikes Back (1980) and Return of the Jedi (1983). Beginning in medias res, the original trilogy serves as the second act of the nine-episode Skywalker saga. It was followed by a prequel trilogy between 1999 and 2005, and a sequel trilogy between 2015 and 2019. Collectively, they are referred to as the "Skywalker Saga" to distinguish them from  films set within the same universe.

The films center on the Galactic Civil War between the Rebel Alliance and the tyrannical Galactic Empire, as well as the archetypical hero's journey of Luke Skywalker in his quest to become a Jedi under the tutelage of exiled Jedi Masters Obi-Wan Kenobi and Yoda. Luke joins forces with Princess Leia, Han Solo, Chewbacca, C-3PO, R2-D2 and the Rebel Alliance in facing the Empire and the evil Sith Lord Darth Vader.

The original Star Wars film received widespread acclaim from critics for its storytelling, characters, John Williams' musical score and its groundbreaking visual and sound effects. The film surpassed 1975's Jaws as the highest grossing film of all time, turning science fiction films into a blockbuster genre, until it was surpassed by E.T. the Extra-Terrestrial in 1982. Both Star Wars and The Empire Strikes Back have been hailed as among the greatest and important films of all time. With the trilogy's success, Star Wars became a pop culture phenomenon, spawning a multi-million dollar merchandising empire. All three films have been inducted by the Library of Congress for preservation in the United States National Film Registry for being "culturally, historically, or aesthetically significant".

Background 
In 1971, Lucas wanted to film an adaptation of the Flash Gordon serial, but could not obtain the rights. He began developing his own story inspired by the work of Edgar Rice Burroughs. Immediately after directing American Graffiti (1973), Lucas wrote a two-page synopsis for his space opera, titled Journal of the Whills. After United Artists, Universal Studios and Disney rejected the film, 20th Century Fox decided to invest in it. Lucas felt his original story was too difficult to understand, so on April 17, 1973, he began writing a 13-page script titled The Star Wars, sharing strong similarities with Akira Kurosawa's The Hidden Fortress (1958). By May 1974, he had expanded the script into the first draft of a screenplay, adding elements such as the Sith and the Death Star, but found that the script had grown too long for a single film. Subsequent drafts evolved into the script of the original film.

Lucas negotiated to retain the sequel rights. Tom Pollock, then Lucas's lawyer, writes: "We came to an agreement that George would retain the sequel rights. Not all the [merchandising rights] that came later, mind you; just the sequel rights. And Fox would get a first opportunity and last refusal right to make the movie." Lucas was offered $50,000 to write, another $50,000 to produce, and $50,000 to direct the film; his directing compensation was later increased to $100,000. He also negotiated the sequel rights and ownership of 40% of the merchandising profits. American Graffiti cast member Harrison Ford had given up on acting to try to become a carpenter, until Lucas hired him to play Han Solo.

Casting 
Thousands of actors were assessed in the search for the trilogy's main cast. The selected actors are considered by many viewers to have onscreen chemistry even though some of them were inexperienced, with the notable exceptions of Alec Guinness and Peter Cushing. Some, like Ford, have called the dialogue in the scripts clunky, and several lines were unscripted; some of these are considered the most memorable moments in the films.

Films 
Star Wars was released on May 25, 1977; unlikely hero Luke Skywalker is drawn into a galactic conflict between the Empire and Rebel Alliance by two droids and an old Jedi Knight; he helps make one of the Rebellion's most significant victories. The film's unanticipated success led Lucas to make it the basis of an elaborate serial. With the backstory he created for the sequel, Lucas decided that the series would be a trilogy of trilogies, with the original film given the subtitle Episode IV – A New Hope to establish it as the first part of the second trilogy. The first sequel, Star Wars: Episode V – The Empire Strikes Back, was released on May 21, 1980, and sees Luke begin training as a Jedi under the last living Jedi master, Yoda. Luke confronts Sith Lord Darth Vader, who is revealed to be Luke's father. Vader attempts to convert Luke to the dark side of the Force. The third film, Episode VI – Return of the Jedi, was released on May 25, 1983, and follows Luke as a full-fledged Jedi. Luke succeeds in redeeming Vader, thereby saving the galaxy from the Empire. The sequels were self-financed by Lucasfilm, and generally advertised without the episodic number distinction present in their opening crawls.

A New Hope 

A Rebel spaceship is intercepted by the Empire above the desert planet of Tatooine. Aboard, the deadliest Imperial sith warlord Darth Vader and his stormtroopers capture Princess Leia Organa, a secret member of the Rebellion. Before her capture, Leia makes sure the droid  will escape with stolen Imperial blueprints for an armored space station, the Death Star, and a holographic message for the Jedi Master Obi-Wan Kenobi, who has been living in exile on Tatooine. Luke helps the droids locate , now a solitary old hermit known as Ben Kenobi. He reveals himself as a friend of Luke's absent father, Anakin Skywalker, who was 's Jedi apprentice until being murdered by Vader. He tells Luke he must also become a Jedi. After discovering his family's homestead has been destroyed by the Empire, they go to the Mos Eisley Cantina and hire the smuggler Han Solo, his Wookiee  Chewbacca and their space freighter, the Millennium Falcon. They discover that Leia's homeworld of Alderaan has been destroyed, and are soon captured by the planet-destroying Death Star itself. While  disables its tractor beam, Luke and Han rescue the captive Princess Leia, passing through incredible dangers. Finally, they deliver the Death Star plans to the Rebel Alliance with the hope of exploiting a weakness, and launch an attack on the Death Star.

The first rough draft, titled The Star Wars, introduced "the Force" and the young hero Luke Starkiller. Annikin  appeared as Luke's father, a wise Jedi knight. Between drafts, Lucas read Joseph Campbell's The Hero with a Thousand Faces, and was surprised to find that his story "was following classical motifs." The third draft replaced (a deceased) Annikin with Ben Kenobi. Some months later, Lucas had negotiated a contract that gave him rights to two sequels. Lucas hired Alan Dean Foster, who was ghostwriting the novelization of the first film, to write them—with the main creative restriction that they could be filmed on a low budget. By 1976, a fourth draft had been prepared for principal photography. The film was titled The Adventures of Luke Starkiller, as taken from the Journal of the Whills, Saga I: The Star Wars. During production, Lucas changed Luke's name to Skywalker and shortened the title to The Star Wars, and finally just Star Wars. At that point, Lucas was not expecting the film to warrant full-scale sequels. The fourth draft of the script underwent subtle changes to become a self-contained story ending with the destruction of the Empire in the Death Star. The intention was that if the film was successful, Lucas could adapt Foster's novels into low-budget sequels. By that point, Lucas had developed a tentative backstory to aid in developing the saga.

Star Wars exceeded all expectations. The success of the film and its merchandise sales led Lucas to make Star Wars the basis of an elaborate film serial, and use the profits to finance his filmmaking center, Skywalker Ranch. After the release of the first sequel, the original film was subtitled Episode IV: A New Hope in the screenplay released in the 1979 book The Art of Star Wars and for all subsequent rereleases beginning with a theatrical rerelease in 1981.

The Empire Strikes Back 

Three years after the destruction of the Death Star, the Empire forces the Rebel Alliance to evacuate its secret base on Hoth. Instructed by Obi-Wan's spirit, Luke travels to the swamp world of Dagobah to find the Jedi Master Yoda in hiding. Luke's Jedi training is interrupted by Vader, who lures him into a trap by capturing Han and Leia at Cloud City, governed by Han's old friend Lando. During a fierce duel, Vader reveals that he is Luke's father.

Owing to financial concerns, Alan Dean Foster's sequel novel, Splinter of the Mind's Eye (1978), restricted the story to Luke, Leia, and Darth Vader. After the success of the original film, Lucas knew a sequel would be granted a reasonable budget, and hired Leigh Brackett to write it from Lucas's story. She finished a draft by early 1978, but died of cancer before Lucas was able to discuss changes he wanted her to make. His disappointment with the first draft may have made him consider new directions. Lucas penned the next draft, the first screenplay to feature episodic numbering for a Star Wars story. Lucas found this draft enjoyable to write, as opposed to the yearlong struggle writing the first film, and quickly wrote two more in April 1978. The plot twist of Vader being Luke's father had drastic effects on the series. After writing these drafts, Lucas fleshed out the backstory between Anakin, Obi-Wan, and the Emperor.

With this new backstory in place, Lucas decided that the series would be a trilogy of trilogies, designating the first sequel Episode V: The Empire Strikes Back in the next draft. Lawrence Kasdan, who had just completed writing Raiders of the Lost Ark, was hired to write the next drafts, and given additional input from director Irvin Kershner. Kasdan, Kershner, and producer Gary Kurtz saw the film as a more serious and adult story, and developed the sequel from the light adventure roots of the first film.

Return of the Jedi 

About a year after Han's capture, Luke joins Leia and Lando in a rescue attempt to save him from the gangster Jabba the Hutt. Afterward, Luke returns to Dagobah to complete his Jedi training, only to find Yoda on his deathbed. In his last words, Yoda confirms the truth about Luke's father, and that Luke must confront Vader again in order to complete his training. As the Rebels lead an attack on the second Death Star, Luke engages Vader in a lightsaber duel as the Emperor watches; both Sith Lords intend to turn Luke to the dark side and take him as their apprentice.

Ford had originally not signed on to appear in a second sequel, but was convinced to return under the condition that his character would die. Kurtz wanted a bittersweet and nuanced ending outlined with Lucas that not only saw Han dead, but also depicted the Rebel forces in pieces, Leia struggling as a queen, and Luke walking off alone (as in a Spaghetti Western)—while Lucas wanted a happier ending, partly to encourage toy sales. This led to tension between the two, resulting in Kurtz leaving the production.

Themes 
The Star Wars trilogy, unlike science fiction that features sleek and futuristic settings, portrays the galaxy as dirty and grimy in Lucas's concept of a "used universe". This was in part inspired by the period films of Akira Kurosawa, which like the original Star Wars trilogy, often begin in medias res without explaining a complete backstory.

Political science has been an important element of Star Wars since the franchise launched in 1977, focusing on a struggle between democracy and dictatorship. Darth Vader's design, initially inspired by Samurai armor, also incorporated a German military helmet. Lucas originally conceived of the Sith as a group that served the Emperor in the same way that the Schutzstaffel (SS) served Adolf Hitler; this was condensed into one character in the form of Vader. Lucas has also drawn parallels between Palpatine and historical dictators such as Julius Caesar, Napoleon Bonaparte, and politicians like Richard Nixon. Stormtroopers borrow the name of World War I "shock" troopers, Imperial officers wear uniforms resembling those of German forces during World War II, and political and security officers resemble the black-clad SS down to the stylized silver death's head on their caps. World War II terms were used for names in the films, e.g. the planets Kessel (a term that refers to a group of encircled forces) and Hoth (after Hermann Hoth, a German general who served on the snow-laden Eastern Front). Shots of the commanders looking through AT-AT walker viewscreens in The Empire Strikes Back resemble tank interiors, and space battles in the original film were based on dogfights from both world wars.

Re-releases 
The original Star Wars film was re-released theatrically in 1978, 1979, 1981 and 1982. All three films were released on various home video formats, including LaserDisc and VHS, until 1996. The trilogy was theatrically re-released in a 1997 "Special Edition", featuring various additions and changes, some of which were negatively received. These versions were released on VHS, replacing the original versions of the films as Lucas's 'original' vision, and were created in part to reinvigorate interest in the saga ahead of the prequel trilogy. The special edition of Star Wars made its broadcast premiere on February 5, 1998 on WB stations across the country (including New York and Los Angeles). Further changes to all three films were made for a DVD release in 2004, intended to bring the films into greater continuity with the prequels. These were re-released in 2006 with bonus discs of the original versions of the films (transferred from the 1993 LaserDiscs). In 2011, original and prequel trilogy box sets were released on Blu-ray, all including another round of alterations.

In the early 2010s, 3D releases were planned for the then-six-film franchise. However, after the financially disappointing 2012 3D release of The Phantom Menace, the rest were cancelled.

In 2019, Kathleen Kennedy, president of Lucasfilm since the 2012 acquisition of the company by Disney, stated that she would not make alterations to Lucas's original trilogy, because "those will always remain his." While promoting The Rise of Skywalker, director J. J. Abrams expressed his hopes that the original versions of the trilogy would be officially released, but said that the powers that be had told him "that that's not necessarily possible". He further said that when making The Force Awakens, he had gotten into a disagreement about the dialogue between Vader and the Emperor in The Empire Strikes Back before realizing that different versions of the film were being referred to; he cited the fan-created "Despecialized Editions" of the films, while the other party had recalled the current official version.

It was initially unclear whether the first six films of the Star Wars franchise would be available on Disney+ upon the service's launch, as TBS held streaming rights through 2024 as part of its cable rights to the franchise. However, on April 11, 2019, it was announced that the films would be available at launch.

Reception

Box office

Critical response 
The original Star Wars film was released in the summer of 1977 to critical acclaim and was a huge summer blockbuster, surpassing Jaws (1975), until 1982 when it was surpassed by E.T. the Extra-Terrestrial. The following year, it won six out of its eleven nominations at the 50th Academy Awards. The success of the first film led to it becoming a pop cultural phenomenon spawning countless TV spin-offs, video games, films and a multi-merchandising empire. It was then proceeded by two instalments, The Empire Strikes Back (1980) and Return of the Jedi (1983), which were also both very successful, with the former's climax, where Vader is revealed as Luke's father, becoming one of the most iconic plot twists in motion picture history.

The original trilogy was praised for its groundbreaking visual and sound effects, John Williams' music, writing, characters and concept. Star Wars and The Empire Strikes Back are considered by many to be among the greatest movies ever made, while Return of the Jedi was well-received but not considered to be on par with its predecessors.

Accolades 
In 1989, the Library of Congress selected the original Star Wars film for preservation in the U.S. National Film Registry, as being "culturally, historically, or aesthetically significant." The Empire Strikes Back was selected in 2010, and Return of the Jedi was selected in 2021. 35 mm reels of the 1997 Special Editions were the versions initially presented for preservation because of the difficulty of transferring from the original prints, but it was later revealed that the Library possessed a copyright deposit print of the original theatrical releases. By 2015, Star Wars had been transferred to a 2K scan which can be viewed by appointment.

Academy Awards

Impact and legacy

Popular culture 
The popularity of the films have generated numerous references in popular culture works from TV series such as The Simpsons, Family Guy, South Park and Robot Chicken and films such as Clerks, Free Guy and  Toy Story 2, and in the political lexicon, as in Ted Kennedy's nickname for Ronald Reagan's Strategic Defense Initiative. The trilogy's artistic and technological achievements have been influential on other filmmakers, including Ridley Scott, James Cameron, David Fincher, Joss Whedon, Peter Jackson and Christopher Nolan, as well as sequel trilogy director J. J. Abrams.

The trilogy's impact has led to future careers of its stars including Mark Hamill (Luke Skywalker), Carrie Fisher (Princess Leia), Harrison Ford (Han Solo), Anthony Daniels (C-3PO), Kenny Baker (R2-D2), Peter Mayhew (Chewbacca), James Earl Jones (Darth Vader), Billy Dee Williams (Lando Calrissian) and Warwick Davis (Wicket W. Warrick).

Prequel and sequel trilogies 

The success and large impact of the original Star Wars trilogy led to two more trilogies, both financially successful, with individual installments receiving mixed to positive reviews.

The prequel trilogy consists of The Phantom Menace (1999), Attack of the Clones (2002) and Revenge of the Sith (2005), all directed by George Lucas. The prequels feature Baker, Daniels, Oz, Mayhew and McDiarmid reprising their roles, alongside Ewan McGregor, Natalie Portman, Hayden Christensen, Liam Neeson and Samuel L. Jackson. After completing his six-film saga, Lucas stated that there would be no further sequels.

In 2012, Disney purchased Lucasfilm and produced a sequel trilogy. This consists of The Force Awakens (2015), The Last Jedi (2017), and The Rise of Skywalker (2019). Lucas had little direct involvement in the creation of these films. The new cast features Daisy Ridley, John Boyega, Oscar Issac, Adam Driver, Domhnall Gleeson and Andy Serkis, with the main original cast reprising their roles.

Other media 

Star Wars has also been spun off into films outside of the Skywalker Saga, numerous TV spin-offs like Star Wars: The Clone Wars, The Mandalorian and other upcoming live-action series for Disney+, as well as hundreds of video games, books, comics and theme park attractions at Disneyland and Walt Disney World.

Notes

References

Works cited 

 
 
 

Trilogy
Trilogies
20th Century Fox films
Lucasfilm films
Film series introduced in 1977